The Stonewall Jackson House, located at 8 East Washington Street in the Historic District of Lexington, Virginia, was the residence of Confederate general Thomas "Stonewall" Jackson from 1858 to 1861.

Architecture
The house is a two-story, four bay, brick dwelling with a large, stone rear addition.  It has a side-gable roof and interior end chimneys.

The house was constructed in 1800, by Cornelius Dorman. Dr. Archibald Graham purchased the house and significantly expanded it in 1845 by adding a stone addition on the rear and remodeling the front and interior to accommodate his medical practice. Dr. Graham sold the house to then-Major Thomas Jackson, a professor at the nearby Virginia Military Institute, on November 4, 1858, for $3000. It is the only house Jackson ever owned. He lived in the brick and stone house with his second wife, Mary Anna Morrison Jackson, until the outbreak of the American Civil War in 1861.

It housed Stonewall Jackson Memorial Hospital from 1907 until 1954; when it was converted to a museum. In 1979 the house was carefully restored to its appearance at the time of the Jacksons' occupancy. The house and garden are owned and operated as a historic house museum by the Virginia Military Institute from April through December. Guided tours are daily, every hour and half hour, from 9:00 a.m. until 4:00 P.M. Closes at 5pm.

It was listed on the National Register of Historic Places in 1973.

Gallery

See also
 Stonewall Jackson's Headquarters

References

External links

Stonewall Jackson House official site

Museums in Lexington, Virginia
Historic house museums in Virginia
Jackson
House
Military and war museums in Virginia
Federal architecture in Virginia
Houses on the National Register of Historic Places in Virginia
1800s architecture in the United States
Houses in Lexington, Virginia
Houses completed in 1802
National Register of Historic Places in Lexington, Virginia
Individually listed contributing properties to historic districts on the National Register in Virginia